The Sunday Times Top Track 250 is an annual league table published in association with The Sunday Times newspaper in the UK. It ranks Britain’s private mid-market growth companies with the biggest sales. It is published in The Sunday Times each October, with an awards event typically held in November, and alumni dinners during the year. The league table is researched and produced by Fast Track, an Oxford based research and networking events business.

About Fast Track 
Fast Track is a leading research and events company that has built a network of the UK’s top-performing private companies, from the fastest-growing to the biggest, through its rankings in The Sunday Times. Founded in 1997 by Hamish Stevenson, it now publishes seven annual league tables and brings company founders and directors together at invitation-only networking awards events and alumni dinners.

Entry criteria 
Companies have to meet the criteria below to be able to qualify for the Top Track 250 league table:

 Sales are typically between £700m (the bottom ranked company on Top Track 100) and £120m
 UK registered, unquoted, and not subsidiaries
 Sales are taken as total turnover, net of VAT
 Sales in the latest year must have grown by 5% or more for companies with the highest sales, graduated to 10% for those with lower sales; or profit growth must have been 5% or more
 Companies must also have operating profit margins that exceed 2%
 Trading weeks in the latest year have to exceed 25
 Companies may have their ultimate holding company offshore

Exclusions

 Companies that are equal joint ventures, or majority-owned by quoted or other companies
 Companies with the majority of sales generated by their quoted subsidiaries
 Companies with fewer than 50 staff
 Not-for-profit companies, co-operative societies, mutual societies, provident associations, and member-owned buying groups

Companies that do not meet all the criteria can still be considered for the Ones to Watch programme, particularly if they forecast good sales growth

Notable alumni companies 
Top Track 250 was launched in 2005 to recognise Britain’s private mid-market growth companies with the biggest sales. Since its launch, more than 1,000 companies have appeared on the league table, including:

 Dyson, which was first featured in 2005 with sales of £277.1m,  and by 2019 was ranked at No.7 on Top Track 100 with sales of £4.4bn, and profits of £1.1bn
 The Watches of Switzerland Group, which featured 10 times before its IPO in May 2019, valuing it at £647m
 B&M Retail featured three times from 2009 to 2011, with initial sales of £255.9m, before its IPO in June 2014 valuing it at £2.7bn
 IHS Markit first featured in 2010 with sales of £305m; floated in 2014 and completed a $13bn merger with IHS in 2016
 Ocado first featured in 2006, with sales of £143m and floated in 2010

Latest Top Track 250 list 
The 16th annual Sunday Times Top Track 250 league table supplement was published on 27 September 2020 and featured established brands including Dr Martens, and Thatchers Cider as well as number 1 ranked company Turner & Townsend.

Previous rankings

2013 Top Track 250 list 
Virgin Active, the health club operator, was ranked 1st in the Sunday Times Top Track 250 with sales of £641.5 million, a rise of 14 places compared to 2012.

Other significant rises in The Top Track 250 league table include Wonga.com (Sales £309.3 million), with a rise of 140; Countryside Properties (Sales £272.9 million) – rise of 85; Opus Energy (Sales £369.5 million) – a rise of 73; The Range (Sales £381.9 million) – a rise of 63.

2012 Top Track 250 list 
Shepherd Group, one of the UK's leading family-owned private businesses, was named in 1st position of The Top Track 2012 with sales of £607.7 million.
 
New entrants to The Top Track 2012 include A.T. Kearney – management consultancy – with sales of £604.1 million; Camelot UK Lotteries – lottery operator – with sales of £574.5 million; Aurora Fashions – fashion retailer – with sales of £568.8 million; City Electrical Factors – electrical parts wholesaler – with sales of £527.2 million.

2011 Top Track 250 list 
Partnership, the life assurance specialist was ranked number 1 in Top Track 250 for the first time in 2011 with sales of £587.9 million, followed by: Noble Foods – egg products manufacturer – with sales of £558.8 million; Farmfoods – frozen food retailer – with sales of £558 million; Edrington – whisky and rum distiller – with sales of £553.4 million; and Gondola – restaurant operator – at position 5, with sales of £545 million.

2010 Top Track 250 list 
The Sunday Times Top Track 250 league table list was published on 17 October 2010 with the title sponsor HSBC. The Sixth Annual Sunday Times HSBC Top Track 250 awards dinner was held at the Jumeirah Carlton Tower Hotel in London on the night of 14 October and was attended by owners and directors of country's leading mid-market private companies. The sixth annual Top Track 250 league table supplement was published in The Sunday Times on 17 October 2010 with HSBC as the title sponsor.

TJ Morris 	    590.3 (Sales £m), Watson Petroleum 584.7 (Sales £m), Aurora Fashions 550.0 (Sales £m), Vestey Group 	    541.2 (Sales £m), Dunbia 	            540.4 (Sales £m), Noble Foods 	    533.5 (Sales £m), NDS Group 	    521.7 (Sales £m), Harrods 	    519.8 (Sales £m), Agricola Group 	    510.8 (Sales £m), Warburtons 	    510.5 (Sales £m)

Southall Travel is the only travel agency included in the influential league table. The agency recorded astounding sales of £203.1 million for the year ending March 2010 and was ranked at 148th place. Other companies from the travel industry listed include Gatwick airport in 16th with sales of £475 million, the Alternative Hotel Group at 18th with sales of £465 million, Travelodge at 71st with sales of £297 million, Park Resorts at 215th with sales of £154 million and Holiday Extras at 236th with sales of £145 million.

2008 Top Track 250 list 
The 250 companies in the list follow on from the Top Track 100 list published in June. The companies account for 5% of GDP and 1.5% of the UK workforce. The Combined turnover is £69 billion ( up £11 billion on 2007)saw an average profit increase of 67% pa with the maximum increase being 114% pa.  Profits across the list vary greatly with many firms in the Profit Track 100 list, totalling over £4 billion.  Employees increased from 400,000 to 477,000 in these companies over last years list. The list includes some well known household names, some of whom were taken private (De listed companies). Some are wholly Family owned others are owned by Venture capital trusts, or bank investors. Some previous entrants have now floated.

This list is compiled from the Sunday Times Top Track 250, 2008.

Other Fast Track publications 
Top Track 250 is one of seven league tables of private companies produced by Fast Track and published in The Sunday Times:
Fast Track 100 – ranks the UK’s fastest-growing private companies based on sales (excluding TMT companies, which appear in Tech Track 100 (see below)
SME Export Track 100 – ranks the UK's SMEs with the fastest-growing international sales
Tech Track 100 – ranks the UK’s fastest-growing private technology companies based on sales (the sister table to Fast Track 100) 
 International Track 200 – ranks the UK’s private mid-market companies with the fastest-growing overseas sales
 Profit Track 100 – ranks the UK’s private companies with the fastest-growing profits 
Top Track 250 – ranks the UK’s leading mid-market private companies based on sales and/or profits growth
Top Track 100 – ranks the UK’s biggest private companies based on sales

References

External links 
 Fast Track web site
 Top Track 250 League Table

The Sunday Times (UK)
Lists of companies of the United Kingdom
Top lists